Southmoor Academy (formerly Southmoor Community School) is a coeducational secondary school and sixth form located in the Grangetown area of Sunderland, Tyne and Wear, England.

Previously a community school administered by Sunderland City Council, Southmoor Community School converted to academy status in May 2012 and was renamed Southmoor Academy. However, the school continues to coordinate with Sunderland City Council for admissions.

Southmoor Academy offers GCSEs and Cambridge Nationals as programs of study for pupils, while students in the sixth form have the option to study from a range of A-levels. Students can also take part in the Duke of Edinburgh's Award program.

References

External links
Southmoor Academy official website

Secondary schools in the City of Sunderland
Academies in the City of Sunderland
Sunderland